Yevgeny Sharonov (born 11 December 1958 in Dzerzhinsk) is a Russian former water polo player who competed in the 1980 Summer Olympics, in the 1988 Summer Olympics, and in the 1992 Summer Olympics.

See also
 Soviet Union men's Olympic water polo team records and statistics
 List of Olympic champions in men's water polo
 List of Olympic medalists in water polo (men)
 List of men's Olympic water polo tournament goalkeepers
 List of world champions in men's water polo
 List of World Aquatics Championships medalists in water polo
 List of members of the International Swimming Hall of Fame

References

External links
 

1958 births
Living people
Soviet male water polo players
Russian male water polo players
Water polo goalkeepers
Olympic water polo players of the Soviet Union
Olympic water polo players of the Unified Team
Water polo players at the 1980 Summer Olympics
Water polo players at the 1988 Summer Olympics
Water polo players at the 1992 Summer Olympics
Olympic gold medalists for the Soviet Union
Olympic bronze medalists for the Soviet Union
Olympic bronze medalists for the Unified Team
Olympic medalists in water polo
Medalists at the 1992 Summer Olympics
Medalists at the 1988 Summer Olympics
Medalists at the 1980 Summer Olympics
People from Dzerzhinsk, Russia
Sportspeople from Nizhny Novgorod Oblast